"Icebreaker" is a song performed by Sami-Norwegian singer Agnete. The song represented Norway in the Eurovision Song Contest 2016, and was written by Agnete along with Gabriel Alares and Ian Curnow. The song was released as a digital download on 2 February 2016 through Aiko Music.

A music video for the song was released on 22 April 2016.

Eurovision Song Contest

Agnete was announced as one of the ten competing artists in Melodi Grand Prix 2016 with the song "Icebreaker" on 19 January 2016. She performed in the final on 27 February, and was later announced as the winner, earning 166,728 votes from the Norwegian public. She represented Norway in the Eurovision Song Contest 2016, performing in the second semi-final on May 12, 2016, but failed to qualify to the May 14 final.

Track listing

Charts

Certifications

Release history

References

Eurovision songs of Norway
Eurovision songs of 2016
2015 songs
2016 singles
Songs written by Ian Curnow
Songs written by Gabriel Alares
Melodi Grand Prix songs